Kevin Paul Calabro (born June 27, 1956) is an American sportscaster based in Seattle, Washington. The longtime voice of the former Seattle SuperSonics NBA franchise, Calabro has primarily called NBA basketball but has also announced collegiate football (alongside Yogi Roth) and basketball as well as MLS soccer. From 2016 to 2020, he served as the television play-by-play voice for the Portland Trail Blazers. He rejoined the Portland Trail Blazers as the Play-By-Play Voice for the 2021-22 season after stepping down in 2020 to be with his family in order to avoid exposure to COVID-19. As of the 2015–16 season, Calabro is the lead play-by-play announcer for NBA on ESPN Radio, including NBA Finals games in 2007, 2014 and 2016 alongside personalities like Jack Ramsay and Hubie Brown. Calabro has done ESPN radio play-by-play for the NBA Conference Finals for a decade in addition to being a regular contributor to TNT's NBA broadcasts. Calabro worked college basketball and football games for the Pac-12 Network and postseason college basketball for Westwood One Sports, including NCAA tournament action.

Career
Calabro is a 1974 graduate of Ben Davis High School in Indianapolis, Indiana. He called high school basketball games in Indiana on WBDG. He graduated from Butler University (1978) where he called Butler Bulldog basketball for four years. Calabro had stops in the Central Hockey League, where he broadcast games for the Indianapolis Checkers, as well as at Purdue University and University of Missouri where he called basketball games. He began his professional career as the play-by-play announcer for the Kansas City Kings in the 1983–84 season.

In the 1987–88 season, Calabro came on board with the SuperSonics alongside the SuperSonics original play-by-play announcer Bob Blackburn. He became the team's sole play-by-play announcer in 1992, following the retirement of Blackburn. Calabro reaching a milestone 1,500 games in 2006. Calabro had an option with the SuperSonics for the 2008–09 season. However on April 11, 2008, Calabro stated he would not continue with the team should they relocate to Oklahoma City, which they ultimately did.

The National Sportscasters and Sportswriters Association named him "Sportscaster of the Year" for the state of Washington in 1997, 2000, 2001, 2002, 2003, and 2006.

Calabro became lead play-by-play personality for the Seattle Sounders FC, a Major League Soccer franchise, in its first year.

Calabro was honored with the 2016 Keith Jackson Sports Media Excellence Award during the 81st Annual Sports Star of the Year Awards.

Calabro has done work on the national level with TNT, TBS, ESPN Radio, and NBA TV. He has also lent his voice to several Microsoft games, including NBA Inside Drive, NBA Full Court Press, and NFL Fever and more recently has been the play-by-play voice of the Sony PlayStation NBA game franchise.

Calabro's brother, David Calabro, is a sportscaster and the sports director with the NBC-affiliate station WTHR in Indianapolis, as well as the public address announcer at the Indianapolis Motor Speedway.

References 

College football announcers
1956 births
Living people
Association football commentators
College basketball announcers in the United States
Butler University alumni
National Basketball Association broadcasters
National Football League announcers
Portland Trail Blazers announcers
Sacramento Kings announcers
Seattle Seahawks announcers
Seattle SuperSonics announcers
People from Indianapolis
High school basketball announcers in the United States
Major League Soccer broadcasters